The 1888 Louisiana gubernatorial election was the second election to take place under the Louisiana Constitution of 1879. As a result of this election Francis T. Nicholls was re-elected Governor of Louisiana. The election saw widespread intimidation of African-Americans which guaranteed the election of the Democratic nominee.

Results
Popular Vote

References

1888
Louisiana
Gubernatorial
April 1888 events